Corvil is a Dublin, Ireland-based network data analytics company that helps businesses make sense of machine data sources and protect performance, security, and transparency of business and infrastructure applications. As of May 2017, prominent financial institutions, such as the New York Stock Exchange, London Stock Exchange, Moscow Stock Exchange, NASDAQ, Nomura, Thomson Reuters, and Commerzbank use Corvil’s services.

History
Corvil was founded in 2000 by Professor John Lewis, three Telia employees and three post-graduate students from Trinity College Dublin and is currently led by CEO Donal Byrne.

Corvil offers solutions for electronic trading businesses, IT operations, and cybersecurity operations.

IT operations can use Corvil’s service to understand IT systems in real-time and improve transparency, performance, and monitoring of applications, infrastructure, services, and users. Cybersecurity operations can use Corvil’s analytics to gain full visibility into malicious threats both in real-time and retrospect, allowing for greater threat detection, prevention, and response times.

Corvil has offices in New York, London, Tokyo, Toronto, and Krakow.

In 2019 Corvil was acquired by Pico.

References

Data companies
Information technology companies of Ireland
Computer companies established in 2000
Irish companies established in 2000